The Argentina national polo team (Spanish: Selección nacional de polo de Argentina) represents Argentina in international polo officially  and it is controlled by the Argentine Polo Association.

See also
Argentine Polo Association
Campo Argentino de Polo

References

External links
Official website

Polo in Argentina
National sports teams of Argentina